Silas P. Smith Opera House was a historic theatre located at West Union, Doddridge County, West Virginia. It had simple Romanesque Revival style architectural details. At one time, the building housed the Doddridge County Public Library. It was demolished on November 13, 2019. It was included in both the West Union Downtown Historic District and the West Union Residential Historic District.

It was listed on the National Register of Historic Places in 2001.

References

Theatres on the National Register of Historic Places in West Virginia
Romanesque Revival architecture in West Virginia
Music venues completed in 1900
Buildings and structures in Doddridge County, West Virginia
Buildings designated early commercial in the National Register of Historic Places in West Virginia
National Register of Historic Places in Doddridge County, West Virginia
Opera houses on the National Register of Historic Places
Event venues on the National Register of Historic Places in West Virginia
Opera houses in West Virginia